In molecular biology, SNORA76 (also known as ACA62) is a non-coding RNA (ncRNA) which modifies other small nuclear RNAs (snRNAs). It is a member of the H/ACA class of small nucleolar RNA that guide the sites of modification of uridines to pseudouridines.

This snoRNA was identified by computational screening and its expression in mouse experimentally verified
by Northern blot and primer extension analysis. ACA62 is proposed to guide the pseudouridylation of 18S rRNA U34
and U105.

References

External links 
 

Non-coding RNA